David James (born 12 December 1942) is a Scottish former professional footballer who played as an outside right in the Football League for Brighton & Hove Albion. He also played for junior club Blantyre Victoria and for Cambridge United of the English Southern League.

References

1942 births
Living people
Sportspeople from Cambuslang
Scottish footballers
Association football wingers
Blantyre Victoria F.C. players
Brighton & Hove Albion F.C. players
Cambridge United F.C. players
Scottish Junior Football Association players
English Football League players
Southern Football League players
Footballers from South Lanarkshire